Williams-Sullivan High School was a PreK–12 school in unincorporated Holmes County, Mississippi, with a Durant postal address. It was a part of the Holmes County School District. Its campus is currently occupied by Williams-Sullivan Elementary School. When Williams-Sullivan High was in operation, all grade levels shared the same campus.

In 2015 the high school sectors of Williams-Sullivan, S.V. Marshall High School, and J.J. McClain High School consolidated into Holmes County Central High School.

References

External links

Public elementary schools in Mississippi
Public middle schools in Mississippi
Public high schools in Mississippi
Schools in Holmes County, Mississippi